Cherundolo is a surname. Notable people with the surname include:

 Chuck Cherundolo (1916–2012), American football player
 Steve Cherundolo (born 1979), American soccer player and coach

See also
 Cerundolo, surname